Epica is a Dutch symphonic metal band, founded by guitarist and vocalist Mark Jansen after his departure from After Forever.

Formed as a symphonic metal band with gothic tendencies, later Epica have incorporated into their sound strong death metal influences. Starting from the third album, progressive metal influences have also become evident. In addition, the band often uses thrash metal and groove metal riffs, black metal passages (mostly in the drum technique), power metal moments and references to Arabic music. Some songs also have electronic shades, djent transitions and folk metal melodies derived from Middle Eastern, Chinese and Celtic traditions. Epica is also known for the attention to the vocal lines that, in contrast to the heavy context, weave very catchy, easy to hold, sophisticated and emotional melodies. The use of soprano vocals and growled vocals, performed by Simone Simons and Mark Jansen respectively, is fundamental to the band's sound. They primarily write their own lyrics, which often deal with philosophical, psychological, spiritual, moral, scientific, environmental, socio-political, global and topical and personal themes. Epica is also known for their wide use of orchestra and opera choirs.

In 2003, Epica's debut album The Phantom Agony was released through Transmission Records. Consign to Oblivion followed in 2005, and debuted at No. 12 in the Dutch charts. They moved labels to Nuclear Blast following Transmission's bankruptcy, and in 2007, released their third studio album The Divine Conspiracy, which charted at No. 9 in the Netherlands. 2009's Design Your Universe was met with yet greater success, debuting at No. 8 in the Dutch Albums Chart, and charting across Europe, also garnering much critical acclaim. Epica's fifth studio album Requiem for the Indifferent was released in 2012. Well received by critics, it achieved international success, entering the US's Billboard 200 at No. 104, and Japan's Oricon Albums Chart at No. 172.

At the beginning of May 2014 the band released their sixth album, The Quantum Enigma, which was a huge international success, debuting on No. 110 on US Billboard 200 and peaking at No. 4 in Epica's homeland Netherlands. In June 2015 Epica was awarded the Music Export Awards, which is given to the Dutch act with the most international success in the past year. Their seventh album, The Holographic Principle, was released in September 2016 to continued international success, equalling the peak chart position set by its predecessor in the Netherlands. The band released their eighth album, Omega, in February 2021.

History

Cry for the Moon (2002)

In early 2002, at only 22 years old, Mark Jansen left After Forever over creative differences.  He then began looking for musicians who would work towards a more classical/symphonic type of music project; this was initially named Sahara Dust. In late 2002, the band courted Helena Iren Michaelsen (from Trail of Tears) as its frontwoman, but shortly after she was replaced by the then unknown Simone Simons, who was Jansen's girlfriend at the time. The band's line-up was completed by guitarist Ad Sluijter, drummer Jeroen Simons, bassist Yves Huts, and keyboard player Coen Janssen. The name was later changed to Epica, inspired by Kamelot's album of the same name.

Epica then assembled a choir (made up of two men and four women) and a string orchestra (three violins, two violas, two cellos and an upright bass) to play along with them. Still under the name Sahara Dust, they produced a two-song demo entitled Cry for the Moon in 2002. As a result, they were signed to Transmission Records.

The Phantom Agony (2002–2004)
The Phantom Agony is the first full-length studio album by Epica. It is the first album recorded by guitarist Mark Jansen after his departure from the band After Forever. The album was produced by Sascha Paeth (known for having produced bands such as Angra, Rhapsody of Fire and Kamelot) and released in June 2003. This album, Mark Jansen continues with the collection of songs that make up "The Embrace That Smothers". The first three parts can be found on Prison of Desire (2000), After Forever's debut album, and the following three parts can be found on The Divine Conspiracy (2007), Epica's third album. These songs deal with the dangers of organized religion. The song "Façade of Reality" on the album was written about the September 11 attacks and includes fragments from speeches by Tony Blair.

The album was followed by three singles: “The Phantom Agony”, “Feint” and “Cry for the Moon”.

Consign to Oblivion/The Score – An Epic Journey (2004–2006)
Their second release, entitled Consign to Oblivion, was influenced by the culture of the Maya civilization, which can be noticed on songs in the "A New Age Dawns" series. "A New Age Dawns" refers to the time system of the Mayan people, which extends up to 2012, and makes no reference of what may happen past said year. Consign to Oblivion was composed with film scores as a basis, with Hans Zimmer and Danny Elfman cited as major inspirations. The album features guest singing by Roy Khan (from Kamelot) on the song "Trois Vierges". Epica also joined Kamelot as a support band on parts of their tour for promotion of The Black Halo album, to which Simons had contributed her vocals on the track "The Haunting (Somewhere in Time)".
Two singles were released from the album, "Solitary Ground" and "Quietus".

Epica's non-metal album The Score – An Epic Journey was released in September 2005 and is the soundtrack for a Dutch movie called Joyride, though it could also be considered to be their third album. Mark Jansen describes the album as typical Epica, "only without the singing, without the guitars, no bass and no drums".

In 2005 and 2006 Epica went on their first tour throughout North America with Kamelot. After the tour, drummer Jeroen Simons left the band because of his wish to pursue other musical interests. In Fall 2006, Simone once again contributed vocals to an album of Kamelot, this time on the tracks "Blücher" and "Season's End" on the album Ghost Opera. In December, Ariën van Weesenbeek from God Dethroned was announced via Epica's official website as the guest drummer for their new album, but not as a permanent band member.

The Divine Conspiracy/The Classical Conspiracy (2006-2009)

In September 2007, Epica headlined their first tour through North America and released their third album, The Divine Conspiracy, this time on a new label, Nuclear Blast. That December, Ariën van Weesenbeek was announced to be Epica's permanent new drummer. The band toured North America again in April 2008 with Into Eternity and Symphony X, this time with Amanda Somerville because Simone had contracted a staph infection (MRSA).  It was released on September 7, 2007 through Nuclear Blast in Europe. The concept that guides the songs is that God created many different religions for humanity to figure out and overcome them so as to discover that, in nature and essence, they were all in fact the same one (hence the name, "The Divine Conspiracy"). Aside from the concept of such a conspiracy, The Divine Conspiracy finalizes The Embrace That Smothers, which began in After Forever's Prison of Desire (Prologue and parts I-III) and continued in Epica's The Phantom Agony (parts IV-VI). In short, The Embrace That Smothers is a collection of 10 songs (Prologue and parts I-IX), which talks about the dangers of organized religion. 

The first single from the album was released on August 10, 2007 entitled "Never Enough", accompanied by a music video and the second single, "Chasing the Dragon," was released in 2008 without an accompanying video.

On December 16, 2008, Ad Sluijter left the band. He left a message on his Myspace page with his reasoning for leaving the band, which included frustration over being unable to enjoy composing music because of deadlines. Ad's successor on guitar was announced in January 2009 to be Isaac Delahaye, who was a member of God Dethroned.

Also in 2008, Epica recorded The Classical Conspiracy, their first live album. The live show took place in Miskolc, Hungary on June 14, 2008, in the framework of the Miskolc Opera Festival (where Therion did a similar show a year before). It included a 40-piece orchestra and a 30-piece choir, and the setlist contained not only the band's songs but also covers of classical pieces of Antonio Vivaldi, Antonín Dvořák, Giuseppe Verdi, Edvard Grieg, and of soundtracks of the movies Star Wars, Spider-Man and Pirates of the Caribbean. It was released on May 8, 2009 through Nuclear Blast Records.

Design Your Universe (2008-2010)

On March 4, 2009, Epica announced their return to the studio where they would begin the recording process for a new album. In April 2009, it was revealed that the new album's title would be Design Your Universe. It continued the A New Age Dawns saga which started on Consign to Oblivion. The album was released on October 16, 2009. To promote this release, they performed in Amsterdam at Paradiso on October 10, 2009. This is the first Epica album to feature Isaac Delahaye. The record also contains a guest appearance from Sonata Arctica vocalist Tony Kakko on the song "White Waters". Reception has been positive from both critics and fans. The album debuted in No. 8 in the Dutch charts, being the highest position an Epica album has reached. The album remained on the chart for five weeks and re-entered in No. 94 for one week due to the band's performance at the 2010 Pinkpop Festival. On December 31, 2009, it was announced through their website that a new single will be released. The song is called "This Is the Time" and all profit will go to World Wide Fund for Nature. After the release of Design Your Universe, Epica set out on a World Tour to support the album. They did a CD release party at The Paradiso in Amsterdam. They performed at some summer festival concerts in the summer of 2010 and returned to the United States and Canada in late fall 2010. Several dates in Europe, especially in the Netherlands, were sold out. The band also did a South American Tour, performing in Brazil, Argentina, Chile, Peru, Bolivia and Uruguay. They played also in many important rock and metal festivals in Europe, such as Wacken Open Air, Pinkpop and Masters of Rock, in front of very large audiences.

Requiem for the Indifferent and Retrospect (2011–2013)
In an interview in November 2010, Simone stated that the band was going to start writing music around February 2011 after their Latin American tour is over. She also stated that they were hoping for a release in the first quarter of 2012. 14 tracks were written without lyrics by May 2011. The band entered the studio later that year, with Sascha Paeth once again as the producer.

On December 1, the band announced that the name of the album would be Requiem for the Indifferent, and would be inspired by such factors as the enormous tension between different religions and cultures, wars, natural disasters and the financial crisis. The album was released on March 9, 2012 in Europe, and on March 13, 2012 in the United States. On March 25, 2012, Epica announced on their website that original bassist Yves Huts and Epica had parted ways, to be replaced by Rob van der Loo (ex-Delain, MaYaN). On April 24, the music video of Storm the Sorrow was officially released, earning 128,000 views on YouTube on the release day. General response to Requiem for the Indifferent was positive. AllMusic stated that the album "is a typically elaborate and ambitious affair, incorporating copious amounts of choral work and classical arrangements into the band's neatly established blend of goth, progressive, power, and symphonic metal." Natalie Zed of About.com staff considered Requiem for the Indifferent "a transitional album for the band", which tries to expand their musical range experimenting with "weird" riffing and new combination of vocals, while "losing none of the richness that has gained them fans."

On 16 September 2012, the band made a guest appearance on the Dutch TV show Niks te gek (translation: "Nothing [is] too crazy"), where mentally disabled people (18 years or older) can get their wishes granted. In the episode, they recorded, together with the autistic Ruurd Woltring, one of his own compositions, "Forevermore". The single was released through Nuclear Blast on 25 September 2012.

The band announced on their official website that on March 23, 2013, they would celebrate the 10th anniversary of Epica in Eindhoven, Netherlands. The concert which would be called Retrospect, would be held in Klokgebouw with a 70-piece orchestra, choirs, international guests and many special effects. The band invited the Hungarian Remenyi Ede Chamber Orchestra and the Choir of Miskolc National Theatre to this show as they were the same orchestra that accompanied Epica in the recording of the live album The Classical Conspiracy. The concert consisted of a 70-piece orchestra, special effects, acrobats, guest vocalist Floor Jansen (Nightwish) and former band members Ad Sluijter, Yves Huts and Jeroen Simons. Finnish singer Tarja Turunen was also invited to the show, but had to decline due to scheduling problems. In the show the band introduced a new song titled "Retrospect" and played "Twin Flames" from Requiem for the Indifferent for the first time. They also played for the second time their longest song "The Divine Conspiracy", however a shorter version of this song was played. During the concert, Coen Janssen announced that Retrospect would be filmed for release as a DVD.

The Quantum Enigma and Epic Metal Fest (2013–2015)

Epica revealed on their official website the first details about their sixth album on February 5, 2014. It was revealed that the new album would be titled The Quantum Enigma and would be released at the beginning of May 2014. Later that same month the band unveiled the album's cover art, which was created by longtime collaborator Stefan Heilemann to accompany the ideas behind the lyrics. Track listing and release dates were announced the same day as well and eventually The Quantum Enigma was released by Nuclear Blast on 2 May (Europe), 5 May (UK) and 13 May (USA). The album was produced by Joost van den Broek and recorded in the Sandlane Recording Facilities in The Netherlands. The Quantum Enigma debuted at 110 on US Billboard 200, making it Epica's second entry on this chart, the previous being Requiem for the Indifferent and charting there in February 2013. In Epica's home country the Netherlands, the album peaked at No. 4 making it their highest ranking album on the chart.

The band stated that, "Where Retrospect reflected on the first decade of our career, we'd like to think The Quantum Enigma marks the beginning of a new era, where Epica sounds heavy, modern and without compromises! More than ever, the creation of this album was a group effort and we are extremely proud of the results! Every detail finds its way into a perfectly balanced mix, and makes Epica sound raw and overwhelming."

On March 17, 2014 the first single, "The Essence of Silence" was made available as a digital download from iTunes, Amazon, Spotify, Deezer and other platforms. Three days later a lyric video was released. "Unchain Utopia" was chosen as the second single and released on April 8, 2014. In an interview with the Sonic Cathedral Webzine, lead vocalist Simone Simons confirmed that a music video for "Unchain Utopia" was set to be released soon. However, a lyric video was released instead, which features footage originally filmed for the music video. Later on the band decided to film a music video for the track "Victims of Contingency", which was released on October 30, 2014.

The band returned to the stage after almost a year on 30 April 2013, in Tilburg in their home country, The Netherlands, which marked the album release show. Throughout 2014 and 2015 the band toured Europe, Asia, Africa and both South and North America in support of The Quantum Enigma. Their last venue before going back to studio took place on 22 November 2015 at the "Klokgebouw" in Eindhoven, the Netherlands, where Epica had held their Retrospect venue. The show was part of the first edition of "Epic Metal Fest", which is a festival organized and curated by the members of the band. Epica announced Epic Metal Fest on June 3, 2015 on their official website and revealed that they would be joined at the festival by bands DragonForce, Eluveitie, Fear Factory, Moonspell, Delain and Periphery. The frontwoman Simone Simons further commented: "It was a long-cherished dream of Epica to host our own festival and we are very proud to be able to present an absolute awesome array of international metal acts. This day will surely be the next highlight in our career and we hope to be able to share it with all of you!"

On June 5, 2015 Epica was awarded the Music Export Award at Buma Rocks, which is given to the Dutch act with the most international success in the past year. The band's guitarist/vocalist Mark Jansen thanked band's fans through their official website: "We are honored with this prestigious award, it’s a big achievement after all those years of investing countless hours and much energy into Epica. It shows that everything you do by following your heart will eventually pay off and will get acknowledged. Thanks to all our fans from all over the world!"

The Holographic Principle, EPs, first book and Design Your Universe 10th Anniversary (2016–2019)

On May 31, 2016 Epica confirmed the title of the band's new album: The Holographic Principle, that was released on September 30, 2016. In an interview with Spark TV the band's singer Simone Simons discussed the complex nature of the album, explaining that the band used more "real, live instruments" than in previous albums and that this album is "one of [the band's] most ambitious offerings to date". The band announced previously that the album would be released as part of their performance at the second edition of Epic Metal Fest, but later revised this, stating it would be released a day earlier.

On September 1, 2017, the band released their first EP The Solace System during the second North American leg of the tour.  The EP features 6 songs that were planned and recorded but never included in The Holographic Principle.

Epica released an EP on December 20, 2017, in Japan titled Epica vs Attack on Titan Songs, featuring covers of songs from the anime Attack on Titan. The EP was released worldwide on July 20, 2018.

On July 3, 2019, Epica announced that they would release their first book later that year. This would include a history of the band, interviews and photos.

The band announced on July 17, 2019 that a Gold Edition of their album Design Your Universe would come out on 4 October 2019 in support of its tenth anniversary, along with a tour.

Omega (2020–present)
Simone Simons had stated on February 1, 2020 that pre-production for the next album had been completed. On March 11, 2020, the band had entered the studio to begin recording their new album, while in turn released studio vlogs showing the album making process for their upcoming eighth studio album.

Mark Jansen had said in an interview that the album's release date could be delayed as a result of the COVID-19 pandemic. It was reported that on April 17, 2020 that Simone Simons had finished recording vocals for the new album. Mark Jansen later confirmed on September 2, 2020 that the album had been recorded, mixed and mastered with orchestrations and choir having been wrapped up before the band began recording.

Nuclear Blast later announced on October 7, 2020 the title for the band's eighth studio album, Omega, along with a release date of February 26, 2021. On October 9, 2020, the first single off of the album, "Abyss of Time – Countdown to Singularity", was released with an official videoclip. The second single from the album, "Freedom – The Wolves Within", was released on November 27, 2020 along with a music video. The third single, "Rivers", was released on January 22, 2021 along with a visualizer video.

On 29 April 2021, in support of Omega, the band announced that they would be performing a livestream event titled Omega Alive, which took place on 12 June 2021.

On 16 September 2022, the band announced their third EP, The Alchemy Project. It was released on 11 November 2022 via Atomic Fire. It was accompanied by official music videos for the songs "The Final Lullaby" and "Sirens – Of Blood and Water".

Musical style

Epica performs a blend of symphonic metal, gothic metal, progressive metal, death metal and, more rarely, thrash metal, power metal and folk metal.

Their former guitarist Ad Sluijter having described the band as "a bridge between power metal and gothic metal." Vocalist Simone Simons has expressed a preference for the group to be described as symphonic metal though the founder of the group Mark Jansen notes that they do not mind being called gothic metal. Mark Jansen having described the band also as "symphonic death metal" and a bridge between death metal and symphonic metal.

The music of Epica is "epic, grand and majestic" and some of them is "more subdued and introspective." The band is also known to have progressive tendencies. A gothic atmosphere and sentimentality is also present in their music.

Epica uses a "trademark of many symphonic and gothic metal bands" in contrasting "two extremes, death grunts and brutality on one side, airy female melodiousness on the other." Eduardo Rivadavia of AllMusic notes that the band's "attraction ultimately hinges on exploring the sonic contrasts of light and dark; the punishing intensity of those elephantine guitar riffs and hyperactive drumming cast against the soaring, layered sweetness of the orchestrated strings and keyboards." Simone Simons delivers classical (operatic) vocals in a mezzo-soprano range, she's begun to sing in a more modern style with belted vocals too (Rock/Pop, as she described it with the release of Consign to Oblivion on an interview) over time, and she has also been known to sometimes sing "with a clear alto voice that has a flawless tone and a lot of emotion." But, subsequently, Simone admitted that she was wrong and that she's not a mezzo-soprano, but a soprano.  Mark Jansen delivers death growls "that are secondary to Simons' singing, but very important in terms of balance and variety." The group is also known to employ human choirs and orchestras with additional embellishments such as spoken word recitals and lyrics in Latin and Arabic.

Members
Current members
Mark Jansen – rhythm guitar, growled vocals, co-lead vocals (2002–present)
Coen Janssen –  keyboards, synthesizer, piano (2002–present)
Simone Simons – lead vocals (2002–present)
Ariën van Weesenbeek – drums (2007–present; session member: 2006–2007)
Isaac Delahaye – lead guitar, backing vocals (2009–present)
Rob van der Loo – bass (2012–present)

Former members
Yves Huts – bass (2002–2012; guested in 2013, 2022)
Ad Sluijter – lead guitar (2002–2008; guested in 2013)
Jeroen Simons – drums (2002–2006; guested in 2013)
Helena Iren Michaelsen – lead vocals (2002)

Timeline

Discography

 The Phantom Agony (2003)
 Consign to Oblivion (2005)
 The Divine Conspiracy (2007)
 Design Your Universe (2009)
 Requiem for the Indifferent (2012)
 The Quantum Enigma (2014)  
 The Holographic Principle (2016)
 Omega (2021)

References

Bibliography

External links

 

Articles which contain graphical timelines
2002 establishments in the Netherlands
Dutch gothic metal musical groups
Dutch power metal musical groups
Dutch progressive metal musical groups
Dutch symphonic metal musical groups
Female-fronted musical groups
Musical groups established in 2002
Nuclear Blast artists